Abbas Gharib, (born 16 June 1942), is an Italian-based architect of Iranian origin. His approach to planning and design, which goes beyond the traditional modernism or contemporary format, has made him well known as an influential figure in the research, practice and teaching of post-contemporary art and architecture.

Life and formation

Early and adult life

Gharib was born in Tehran and raised in an Iranian lay family. The house where the family used to live was situated in the old center of the traditional part of Tehran. He completed his primary educations in Tehran, Bersabé primary school, Saint Luis elementary and Ferdowsi middle school.

In 1952, his family moved to a new house in the northern part of the city where he resided until 1960, when he received his diploma from Hadaf high school. In 1958 he made his first visit to Europe, which helped him in his decision to leave his native country definitively and start living in Italy in 1962, where he enrolled to University IUAV of Venice. He stayed in Venice until 1973, taking part in the educational and artistic city life.  As a child and later as a student, was talented for geometric and drawing subjects, therefore in adulthood the interest for architecture. In 1972 he married with an Italian architect, Sandra Villa and from that marriage had two children Samì (12 January 1972) now sociologist and Leila (28 February 1983), now musician

The choice of Venice
In May 1958, at the end of an extensive travel through the main European Capitals and cities, Gharib, then aged sixteen, made his first stay to Italy, as well as to Rome, where he was deeply impressed by the beauty of this city and the richness of its art and architecture heritage. In 1960, therefore, he returned to Europe, principally to Italy, moving through the peninsula from north to south and finally to Venice. The beauty of Venice and its cultural and artistic lifestyle, in the presence of creative figures like Peggy Guggenheim, Lucio Fontana, Allen Ginsberg, Ezra Pound, Carlo Scarpa in the Sixties and Seventies, influenced him to such an extent that he decided to settle there, moving away from his original area of intellectual life in Tehran: a decision which was basic to his consecutive formation.

Education

He studied architecture at the Università Iuav di Venezia, where in 1969 he became qualified in the urban planning sector in 1969 he never abandoned his interest in architectural projects and design. This dual interest is always evident in his practice.
In the Eighties, he shifted from two-dimensional evaluation of projects to three-dimensional evaluation of complex perspectives. This is the most influential topic in his post graduate self-formation, liberating him from the Modernist crisscross grid towards unconfined volumes characterized by transparency, fluidity, flexibility and smooth dynamics curving surfaces.

Professional practice
Gharib became a licensed architect in 1969 and practiced in Venice until 1973. In 1981, from 1974 to 1980, after experiences outside of Italy, in 1981 he opened his office in Verona, Italy, under the name of Studio Gharib, Architecture & Design.  As of 2015, Gharib still works at the firm, reinventing the built environment, under the guidance of sustainable and innovative architectural spatiality. The design method in his Studio turned out to be fluid and meta-metric, opposed to abstract methods and metric process of Modernism. In fact, the multiple sequences of spatial sections and the successions of constructive models have replaced the flat and static drawings.
The Studio, in collaboration with professional individuals, ventured into a wide range of disciplines, striving to break the boundaries imposed by traditional professional constraints. This unconventional approach to design produced a spirit of independence, reflected in the research and carried out in the works created by the Studio. The forms of spaces and objects are reflected in numerous designs for architectural competitions, professional projects and buildings, evidencing true multi-disciplinary approach.

Design criteria

Gharib has gradually distanced himself from Modern Movement design methods, considering 
them to be abstract and self-referential, and oriented himself towards the Post-contemporary movement and the Complexity Theory. 
These, in his view, have a closer relationship with the shifting apparatus of context, aware that these components, interacting with politics, economies, science, technology and social movements, generate sophisticated results that require complex solutions.
The Studio transitioned from the traditional notions of modern Rationalism to the concept of anthropo-geo-morpho-genesis, i.e., from concepts of Morphology and Topography to the advanced science of Morphing and Topology. The consequence of this transformation of design criteria, for both architectural spaces, urban planning and physical objects, is that design is based on renewed attention to interactive relationships between space and surrounding context. This recognition of the interactive dynamics between nature and culture, between social and economical components of context, has been accompanied by digital integration of projects into tridimensional spaces in place of linear, flat and two-dimensional projections typical of Modernist methods.

Shifting to social architecture
The Pritzker Architecture Prize of 2014 awarded to the Japanese architect, Shigeru Ban, a former superstars, takes him to be among the firsts to move towards the Social architecture and to share the new trends in architectural planning. This was an alarm bell for superstars of architecture to think about the life style of Social architecture instead of the personal styles.

For the renovated approach of his Studio   in Italy, the method of creativity stands in the promotion of design solutions able to feed the urban regeneration as cultural, inventive, educational and functional diversities for the fertile new languages, and lifestyles, without following the repetition mannerist projects and what they produce, believing that, creative solutions fed from the talent of the environmental components rather than from that of the designers

His role in evolving the method of creative development in Tenstar Community Association proposes through the development of an integrated set of creative disciplines, an education that transforms the urban regeneration in an added value through the interaction of creative disciplines. An added value that allows the users of the projects to meet their operational needs in an area renovated with sustainable long-term economy based on the use of knowledge (knowledge based production) rather than on the dispersion of energy (energy based production).

Approach to cinema and music
As one of the founders of Tenstar Community, a multidisciplinary cultural Association, he is particularly involved with Association's sectors such as cinema, music visual arts and photography beside architecture and urban regeneration.  These involvements happen also for designing workshops and events for these disciplines or for being invited as jury in the film festivals such as San Giò Film Festival  and for being active in workshops such as that extraordinary one with Iranian Director Abbas Kiarostami, who was, awarded by Tenstar Community Cinematography Prize 2015: “Why Cinema”

Conferences and lectures
 "19th century interventions in Vienna: Reading of the Ring", lecture at University IUAV of Venice, Italy, 1971;
 "Topics of the New Architectural Trends", lecture at University of Tehran, Faculty of Architecture, Iran, 1973;
 "Tribal memory in the architectural thought", at the International Congress of Architecture, Shiraz, Iran, 1975;
 "Monuments of underdevelopment", lectures at University IUAV of Venice, Italy, 1976;
 " Self-expressive buildings", lecture at the University of Tehran, Faculty of Architecture, Iran 1978;
 "Post-modernism, deconstruction and folding in architecture", at the cycle of conferences organized by the Ministry of Housing and Construction, Tehran, Iran, 1985;
 "The Toppled Garden", lecture given to the "Società Letteraria", Verona, Italy, 1992;
 "The Mirror Garden", lectures at the "Course of garden arts", University IUAV of Venice, Italy,1993;
 "Lines, thoughts and design assumptions", lecture at the "International day of furniture', organized by 'Abitare il Tempo', Verona, Italy,14–18 October 1993;
 “Post-contemporary: danger and opportunity": lectures at the Institute for Urban Studies in Architecture USA Institute, Verona, Italy 1994;
 "Space: continuous, cohesive, and heterogeneous", lectures at the Institute for Urban Studies in Architecture New York, N.Y., US;
 "Space: continuous, cohesive, and heterogeneous" lectures at Teague University, Department of Architecture, Teague, Korea, 1995;
 "Space of the urban-place", at the international design seminar for the new building of the University IUAV of Venice, Italy, 1996;
 "Paradigms of complexity in architecture new trends", lecture at "AGAV" Conference, the Young Architects Association, Verona, Italy, 2000;
 "Design, Design system, and Design of professionalism", lectures at Verona Fine Arts Academy Cignaroli, Verona, Italy 2000 – 2010;

Awards
1971
 competition for a new student hostel building, Piovego Padua, Italy, second prize;
 competition for the sculptural work in the psychiatric hospital, Marzana Verona, Italy, second prize;
1975
 competition for the urban and architectural planning of the seaside city of Rudsar, Rudsar Caspian Sea, Iran, third prize;
 competition for the new headquarters of the Iranian National Insurance Company "Bimeh", with Shahab Katouzian, first prize;
1979
 competition "the Sun and the habitat" for the use of alternative energy in residential and educational buildings, Valpantena, Gruppo Ferro", Verona, Italy, first prize;
1980
 first European competition for the use of solar passive energy, Giudeca, Venice, Italy selected project;
1982
 competition for the new headquarters of "AGEC", Verona, Italy, selected project;
1983
 competition for the Center of Social and multipurpose recreational performances of Scaligero Castle of Villafranca, Verona, Italy, second prize;
1992
 regional competition for the furniture design organized by the association of industrialists of Treviso, Italy, second prize;
 competition for the transformation of the monumental furnaces of Asolo, Italy with the construction of the new administrative, production, and exhibition center of ceramic arts, third prize;
2001
 competition for the headquarters of the Center for the Development of High Technology in Iran: "Fadak", (Senior Design Consultant to Bahram Shirdel and Partners Office), first prize;
2006
 Competition for Center for the Study, Development, Exhibition and Promotion of Carpets and Rugs, (With Studio M. Eccheli & R. Campagnola), Tabriz, Iran, third prize;
2009
 competition of "Housing Development for the Mediterranean Countries" in Leverano of Lecce, Leverano Italy selected project;

Publications
 National Iranian Insurance Company Competition
“The prize winners of the national competition to design the new headquarters of "Bimeh", the National Insurance Company of Iran", "Art & Architecture Magazine 31/32, Tehran: Art & Architecture Editions, December 1975, 39 – 47;

 Iran National Library
“The International Architectural competition”, Art & Architecture Magazine 45/46, Tehran: Art & Architecture Editions April 1978, 119;

Il Sole e l’Habitat
“Gruppo Ferro”, acts of the national competition: the sun and the habitat for the use of alternative energy in residential and educational buildings, Rome – Italy: Kappa, November 1981, 296 – 299;

600 Contreprojets pour les Halles
“Consultation international pour l'amènagement du quartier des Halles de Paris" Volume, Volume, Paris: Editions du Moniteur, 1981, 377;

 Ghadjar pavilion
“Abbas Gharib e Sandra Villa – sistemazione di un padiglione Ghadjar presso Tehran”, Architettura nei paesi islamici, Second International Architecture Exhibition, la Biennale, Volume, Venice – Italy: La Biennale di Venezia Editions, 1982, 278;

 Ponte dell’Accademia,
Maffioltti, Serena. “ricerca”, Costruire Magazine 33, Biennale di Venezia issue, Milan – Italy: Abitare Segesta, October 1985, p. 235;

 The tower where the desire can live
Gharib,Abbas. Verticelli, Danilo. Villa, Sandra. “The neo-eclectic house – projects for the cultural design exhibitions for the Italian furniture fair, Abitare il tempo, volume, Venice – Italy: Arsenale, 1992, 93, 112;

 The self expressive object
Gharib,Abbas. Verticelli, Danilo. Villa, Sandra. “Room with a View, Abitare il tempo, volume, Bologna: Grafiche Zanini, 1993, 37–42, 108;

 Open house, section x – x
Gharib, Abbas. Verticelli, Danilo. Villa, Sandra. Abitare il tempo, Volume, “Ten years of research, experimentation and new perspectives”, Bologna – Italy: Grafiche Zanini, 1995, 221;

 Open house section x – x
Dorfles, Gillo. “Events”, Ottagono Magazine 110, Review of Abitare il tempo, Milan – Italy,: CO.P.IN.A., March 1994, 83 – 84,

 “Accademia G.B. Cignaroli – Verona”
“Ricognizioni Design 360° Magazine 14, Oggetto locale Issue, Verona – Italy Grafiche Aurora, 2001, cover, 27

 New National Museum of Korea
“Abbas Gharib – Italy, International Architectural Competition for the new National Museum of Korea" Volume, Seoul: Hae-jak Kang / Ki Moon Dang Editors, 1995, 362
 Accademia G.B. Cignaroli – Verona, Ricognizioni Design 360° Magazine, Oggetto locale Issue, No. 14, cover & page 27, Grafiche Aurora Publisher, Verona 2001;
Design Works
Gharib, Abbas. interviewed by Grego, Susanna. “cronache di design a Verona" in the Magazine of the Architectural Association of the province of Verona 57, Verona – Italy: Studio 12, June 2002, cover, 31–33

Last Works
Gharib, Abbas. interviewed by Grego, Susanna. “Ozio Creativo sarà il lavoro del futuro?” in the Magazine of the Architectural Association of the province of Verona, No. 62, Verona – Italy: Studio 12, April 2002, 34 – 35;

 Iran Oil Industry HQ, Tehran,
Arnaboldi, Mario Antoni. “Abbas Gharib, due mondi due lingue”, L’Arca, the international magazine of architecture, design and visual communication No. 181, Milan – Italy, l’Arca S.p.A. Editori, May 2003, cover, 68–71;

 Competition for the Center of Cooperation in High Technology, Iran, Memar Quarterly Magazine of Architecture and Urban Design 13, Tehran – Iran:Kia Naghsh, 2003, 74 – 80
  Headquarters of Iran Oil Industry in Tehran
Arnaboldi, Mario Antonio. “Architecture: Dialogues and Letters – 12, Ad Abbas Gharib per l’Headquarters dell’ Iran Oil Industry a Tehran", Milan – Italy: Mimesis, 2004, 185, 203–204;

 Main projects
Gharib, Abbas. Interviewed by Ahmad Zohadi. “For a methodology of project. A tool toward the future – An interview with Abbas Gharib, Iranian Architect”, Tehran – Iran, Architecture, Construction and E-Sciences Magazine 1, Contemporary challenges, architecture and thought issue, Tehran, Zolal Editors, November 2004, cover, 24–29;

Abbas Gharib “Pol” Art & Cultural Center,
Candani, Elena. “Meeting between two worlds”, L’Arca, the international magazine of architecture, design and visual communication 220, Milan – Italy: l’Arca S.p.A. Editori, December 2006, 48–53;

Super Compact,
“Progetti per il mobile 2008”, Dossier Compo Mobili, Furniture Design Magazine, European furniture components 53, Snatarcangelo Romagna (RN): Magioli SpA.Editore, January 2009, 68;

Recent projects
Gharib, Abbas. interviewed by Castelluci, Alessandra. “equilibrio di architettura (tra due mondi)”, Studio Gharib – Verona, In Cariera & Professioni Magazine 2, Bologna – Italy: Golfarelli Editore, June 2008, 36–39;

Progetto N. 44
Dell’Osso, Guido R. “Edilpro, Architettura bioclimatica e sostenibilità nella casa per i paesi del Mediterraneo”, Casarano (Le) Italy: Il tacco d’Italia Editore, November 2009, Volume, Cover, 73–79;

'''Carso 2014+, International design competition …”
“Arch. Abbas Gharib”, Abitare Magazine 509, Milan – Italy: Abitare Segesta, 2011, 25;

See also
Post-contemporary
Tenstar Community

References

External links
 
  Susanna Grego, "Conversazione con Abbas Gharib", Architetti Verona 62 p. 34–35,
 Abbas Gharib, Digital Scapes: Global Remix, 38° Maromomacc Italy,
 Ad Abbas Gharib, Google Books; 

1942 births
Living people
20th-century Italian architects
Iranian architects
Iranian emigrants to Italy
People from Tehran